Warner Center is a master-planned neighborhood and business district development in the Canoga Park and Woodland Hills neighborhoods of the San Fernando Valley in Los Angeles, California.

Warner Center, which began as a master-planned area, is designated as a Regional Center within the City's Canoga Park-West Hills-Winnetka-Woodland Hills Community Plan. Historically, Warner Center is generally bounded by Vanowen Street to the north, the Ventura Freeway to the south, De Soto Avenue to the east, and Topanga Canyon Boulevard on the west. The Warner Center 2035 Plan (adopted in December 2013) added the area between Vanowen and the LA River to the plan area, which comprises approximately 1,100 acres or 1.7 square miles.

The area was originally planned to relieve traffic to and from downtown Los Angeles, as well as generate jobs in the San Fernando Valley. It was first envisioned in the late 1960s.

History
Warner Center is named for Harry Warner, the eldest of the Warner Brothers, who owned the land since the 1940s, which he used as a horse ranch. His family donated  of land in 1967 that became the Warner Center Park (also known as the Warner Ranch Park), situated east of Topanga Canyon Boulevard between Califa Street and Marylee Street.

Aetna acquired the land for long-term investment and development purposes, and later brought in Kaiser as a joint venture partner. Mr. Allison spearheaded the early land planning, subdivision and development efforts on behalf of Kaiser Aetna.

Initially, large tracts of the Warner Ranch land were developed in the Canoga Park portion, between Victory Boulevard and Vanowen Avenue. Topanga Plaza was first, followed by engineering facilities and headquarter offices for the aerospace companies Rocketdyne and Litton Industries.

With the sale of the land to Aetna, the pace of development in Warner Center accelerated. Kaiser Aetna acted as a master developer, offering land for sale or lease, buildings for sale or lease, and leased buildings built to owner's specifications. Development sites from very small parcels up to 100 or more acres were offered.

In the ensuing 20 years, much of the build-out of Warner Center occurred, including approximately 4,300 multi-family dwelling units, and millions of square feet of commercial and office space.  Notable developments include:

 The  Promenade Mall which opened in 1973.
 Kaiser Permanente Hospital, which opened in 1986.
 The 1.1 million square foot Warner Center Business Park built in the mid to late 1970s, consisting of low and mid-rise office and industrial buildings.
 The 1.8 million square foot Warner Center Plaza built out from the early 1980s to the early 1990s, with its signature high-rise office buildings that give Warner Center its distinct skyline.
 The Trillium office project, consisting of twin 17-story office towers totaling 600,000 square feet, built in the late 1980s.

Real estate developer Robert Voit, in partnerships with Robert Allison and New England Life Insurance Company, developed the Warner Center Business Park and Warner Center Plaza. The partnerships were wound down in the early 1990s and since that time the ownership of the properties has become fragmented.

During the 1990s following the completion of the Warner Center Plaza project, relatively little new development occurred. The economic slowdown of the early 1990s, combined with the damage from the 1994 Northridge earthquake, served to put the brakes on new development for the rest of the decade.

The next major project was LNR Warner Center, which was built at the site of the former Prudential Life Insurance Company buildings between 2001 and 2005, totaling over 1.4 million square feet of primarily office space.

Also, in the early 2000s, a flurry of new multifamily housing projects were built.  This burst of residential building created concerns in the community about issues such as traffic. In reaction to these concerns, City Councilmember Dennis Zine initiated a restudy of the Warner Center Specific Plan in 2005.

The Warner Center 2035 Plan (WC 2035 Plan) is a development blueprint for Warner Center that emphasizes mixed-use and transit-oriented development, walkability, and sustainability.

A Citizen's Advisory Committee was established in 2005, consisting of members of the local neighborhood councils including the Woodland Hills-Warner Center Neighborhood Council and the Canoga Park Neighborhood Council as well as business and property owners, which worked with city planning staff and its consultants to develop the plan. In December 2013 the plan was adopted by the Los Angeles City Council.

By 2035, the plan anticipates an additional:
 14 million square feet of nonresidential building area
 20,000 residential dwelling units
 49,000 jobs

In 2011, the Los Angeles Daily News quoted City Planner Ken Bernstein as describing a new vision for Warner Center as more "cosmopolitan, 21st century." The paper added: "The plan would allow 40-story skyscrapers. Small retail shops — where locals could walk to buy basics — would be encouraged, in an area now dominated by national chains and big malls. The long superblocks and six-lane thoroughfares would be 'cut up' by adding paseos and crosswalks to create a more intimate feel for pedestrians."

In 2012 the City Council approved the Village at Westfield Topanga - which included a new Costco, as well as a massive retail, dining, and entertainment development that would combine with two existing Westfield Warner Center malls (Westfield Topanga Mall and Westfield Promenade Mall).

The , The Promenade, was sold in March 2022 to sports owner and real estate developer Stan Kroenke for approximately $150 million. The combined  was expected to be developed into a permanent team headquarters and practice facility for the Los Angeles Rams. The center will continue to operate as an open-air lifestyle and retail destination.

Economy

Warner Center contains a mix of companies and industries, with a concentration in healthcare, financial services and professional services.  Aerospace and manufacturing uses have declined significantly during its history, primarily attributable to regional business climate factors that favor moving production out of California.  Approximately 40,000 employees worked within the Warner Center area as of 2013.

Transit
In October 2005, the Orange Line was established creating an east–west link across the San Fernando Valley linking Warner Center with North Hollywood and the Metro Red Line. In June 2012, the Orange Line was expanded to include a north–south line connecting Warner Center with Chatsworth and the MetroLink system.  The G Line (name changed in 2020) no longer serves Warner Center and is replaced with Metro Route 601 which runs between the Canoga station and Warner Center.

Emergency services

Fire service
Los Angeles Fire Department Station 84 (Woodland Hills) and Station 72 (Canoga Park) serve Warner Center.

Police service
Security officers employed by Allied Universal Security Services continuously monitor and patrol all buildings, parking structures, and loading docks.
Los Angeles Police Department operates the nearby Topanga Community Police Station.

Hospital
Kaiser Permanente Woodland Hills Medical Center is a general medical and surgical hospital in Warner Center. Kaiser Permanente Medical Center consists of a 175-bed hospital and serves 2 million residents of the San Fernando Valley. Kaiser Permanente Woodland Hills Hospital, a non-profit general medical and surgical facility, is operated by Kaiser Foundation Hospital.

The hospital had 12,600 admissions in the latest year for which data are available. It performed 4,055 annual inpatient and 5,197 outpatient surgeries. Its emergency room had 38,131 visits. Kaiser Permanente Woodland Hills Hospital is the highest ranked hospital in the San Fernando Valley, and ranked 13th highest hospital among Los Angeles-area hospitals because of its strength in specialties such as cancer, diabetes, endocrinology, gynecology, orthopedics and urology."

References

External links

West Valley Warner Center Chamber of Commerce 
Warner Center Association
Woodland Hills Warner Center Neighborhood Council
Valley Cultural Center
Warner Center Metro Project

Neighborhoods in Los Angeles
Communities in the San Fernando Valley
Woodland Hills, Los Angeles